Leela Hamid (born ) is a retired Maldivian female volleyball player, playing as a middle blocker. She was part of the Maldives women's national volleyball team. 

She participated at the 2010 Asian Games. On club level she played for Police in 2010.

References

1984 births
Living people
Maldivian women's volleyball players
Volleyball players at the 2010 Asian Games
Place of birth missing (living people)
Asian Games competitors for the Maldives